E3 AF is the seventh studio album by English rapper Dizzee Rascal, released on 30 October 2020 by Dirtee Stank and Island Records.

Background
E3 AF is Rascal's first full-length album since 2017's Raskit.
 
Rascal announced the album on Instagram on 19 August 2020, stating: "I've spent the last 3 years losing and finding myself in music and I've made something flawless. I made this album for YOU! I want you to play it at home, in your car or wherever you want but I want you to listen to it all the way through and you better have some BASS!! The link-ups are mad and I didn't come to play! You're welcome."

The album's title refers to the E3 postal code district where he grew up in Bow, East London.

Shortly before the album's release, Rascal was scheduled to perform alongside Wiley, M Huncho, and The Streets at Utilita Live from the Drive In, a series of socially distanced drive-in concerts, which were cancelled due to reimposed COVID-19 lockdowns in Leicester, England.

Release and promotion
The album was announced on 19 August 2020, alongside the release of the lead single. The album was originally announced for release on 9 October, but was later delayed to 30 October.

Singles
E3 AF was preceded by three singles. The lead single "L.L.L.L. (Love Life Live Large)", featuring Chip, was released on 20 August 2020. The second single, "Act Like You Know", featuring Smoke Boys, was released on 10 September 2020. The third and final single, "Body Loose", which samples the Architechs 2000 hit "Body Groove", was released on 2 October 2020.

Track listing

Personnel 
 Dizzee Rascal – vocals, primary artist 

Other musicians

 P Money – guest vocals 
 D Double E – guest vocals 
 Frisco – guest vocals 
 Chip – guest vocals 
 Steel Banglez – guest vocals 
 Alicaì Harley – guest vocals 
 Ghetts – guest vocals 
 Kano – guest vocals 
 Smoke Boys – guest vocals 
 Ocean Wisdom – guest vocals 
 Rob Jones TV – guest vocals

Charts

References

2020 albums
Dizzee Rascal albums
Island Records albums